Bictegravir/emtricitabine/tenofovir alafenamide, sold under the brand name Biktarvy, is a fixed-dose combination antiretroviral medication for the treatment of HIV/AIDS.  One tablet, taken orally once daily, contains 50mg bictegravir, 200mg emtricitabine, and 25mg tenofovir alafenamide.  It was approved for use in the United States in February 2018, and for use in the European Union in June 2018.

Combination therapy 
Bictegravir/emtricitabine/tenofovir alafenamide is an example of a combination drug that can be taken as a complete regimen for treatment of the human immunodeficiency virus.

Combination therapy for HIV, often called highly active antiretroviral therapy (HAART), is composed of two or more types of antiretroviral drugs.  Combination therapy decreases the likelihood that drug resistance will occur, because it is unlikely that the HIV-1 strains will be able to mutate enough to become resistant to all drugs being used in the combination.  Combination therapy increases the length of lives of patients with HIV-1, and can greatly reduce the possibility for transmission of the virus.

Components 

Bictegravir (BIC) is an integrase strand transfer inhibitor (INSTI). Bictegravir is different from other INSTIs because it contains a bridged bicyclic ring and a distinct benzyl tail with a 2,4,6-trifluorobenzyl group.  This contributes to an increase in plasma protein binding and a reduction of activation of the pregnane X receptor (PXR).   These changes minimize interactions between drugs, lower clearance, and increase solubility.  Bictegravir was found to be less drug resistant than other drugs in the same class.

Emtricitabine (FTC) is a nucleoside reverse transcriptase inhibitor (NRTI) that is a synthetic fluoro derivative of thiacytidine. Within the cell, emtricitabine becomes phosphorylated, which forms emtricitabine 5'-triphosphate within the cell. This allows for the drug to compete with the viral and host substrate and ultimately causes a termination of DNA chain elongation. Underlying hepatitis B virus (HBV) can interact with emtricitabine to cause significant liver damage, but it does not have a significant detrimental effect on the liver when given to patients without HBV.

Tenofovir alafenamide (TAF) is a prodrug of tenofovir that functions as a nucleotide reverse transcriptase inhibitor (NRTI). Other prodrugs for tenofovir have been tested, but TAF is more efficient at refining HIV-1 therapy. It converts intracellularly to TFV diphosphate, which is a metabolite in HIV target cells. Thus, TAF has higher active metabolite concentrations and lower plasma TFV than other Tenofovir prodrugs. TAF is metabolized primarily with the kidneys, and has a lower dosage than other prodrugs, so it is less detrimental to the renal elimination system.

Medical uses 
This drug regimen is intended and approved for adults with HIV-1 infection who have had no previous antiretroviral treatment or for those with less than 50 copies of HIV-1 RNA per mL. Patients with HIV-1 should not have previously had any adverse reactions or resistance to bictegravir, emtricitabine, or tenofovir alafenamide.

Side effects 

This drug should not be co-administered with dofetilide or rifampin.  Dofetilide when taken with bictegravir/emtricitabine/tenofovir alafenamide can cause an increase in dofetilide plasma concentrations, which can lead to death.  Rifampin and bictegravir/emtricitabine/tenofovir alafenamide when taken together can decrease bictegravir plasma concentrations and cause resistance to bictegravir/emtricitabine/tenofovir alafenamide.  Other HIV-1 antiretroviral drugs should not be taken with this therapy.

If kidney disease or development of renal impairment is seen, the drug should be discontinued. Discontinuation of bictegravir/emtricitabine/tenofovir alafenamide in patients with hepatitis B and HIV-1 has been shown to increase the prevalence of hepatitis B, causing liver decompensation and liver failure.

Adverse drug reactions include, but are not limited to, diarrhea, nausea, and headache.

References

External links 
 
 
 

Fixed dose combination (antiretroviral)